Below is the list of asteroid close approaches to Earth in 2013. This was the year of the Chelyabinsk impact, in addition to the other NEO flybys

Timeline of known close approaches less than one lunar distance from Earth in 2013 

A list of known Near-Earth asteroid close approaches less than 1 lunar distance (384,400 km or 0.00256 AU) from Earth in 2013.

 

 

 

 

 

This list does not include any of the 24 objects that collided with earth in 2013, none of which were discovered in advance, but were recorded by sensors designed to detect detonation of nuclear devices. Of the 24 objects so detected, 5 had an impact energy greater than that of a 1 kiloton device including the 440 kiloton Chelyabinsk meteor, estimated at 20 m in diameter, which injured around 1500 people and damaged over 7000 buildings.

Warning Times by Size 
This sub-section visualises the warning times of the close approaches listed in the above table, depending on the size of the asteroid. The sizes of the charts show the relative sizes of the asteroids to scale. For comparison, the approximate size of a person is also shown. This is based the absolute magnitude of each asteroid, an approximate measure of size based on brightness.

Abs Magnitude 30 and greater
 (size of a person for comparison)

Abs Magnitude 29-30

Absolute Magnitude 28-29

Absolute Magnitude 27-28

Absolute Magnitude 26-27

(probable size of the Chelyabinsk meteor)

Absolute Magnitude less than 25 (largest)

Notes

Additional examples

An example list of near-Earth asteroids that passed more than 1 lunar distance (384,400 km or 0.00256 AU) from Earth in 2013.
, December 18, 2013 (1.9 LD)
, December 11, 2013 (2 LD)
3361 Orpheus, December 7, 2013 (40.1 LD)
, November 18, 2013 (3 LD)
, August 24, 2013
, August 8, 2013
, July 30, 2013
, July 26, 2013
, June 4, 2013
, May 29, 2013
, May 23, 2013
, March 20, 2013
, March 9, 2013

See also
List of asteroid close approaches to Earth
List of asteroid close approaches to Earth in 2012
List of asteroid close approaches to Earth in 2014

References

External links
https://web.archive.org/web/20140307125729/http://neo.jpl.nasa.gov/ca/
Summary of current NEOCP objects / Comments on NEOCP objects (Project Pluto)
Near-Earth object close approaches ±30 days within 5 LD

 
close approaches to Earth in 2013
Near-Earth asteroids